Pascal Thrier (born 4 November 1984) is a Swiss former professional footballer who played as a full back.

References

1984 births
Living people
Association football fullbacks
Swiss men's footballers
Swiss Super League players
FC Winterthur players
FC Lugano players
FC Wohlen players
FC Schaffhausen players
FC St. Gallen players
Footballers from Zürich